The Snake River fine-spotted cutthroat trout is a form of the cutthroat trout (Oncorhynchus clarkii) that is considered either as a separate subspecies O. c. behnkei, or as a variety of the Yellowstone cutthroat trout (O. c. bouvieri). The fish takes its common name from its original habitat, the Snake River of southern Idaho and western Wyoming, and from its unusual pattern of hundreds of small spots that cover most of its body, differing from the larger-spotted Yellowstone cutthroat pattern. Genetically, it cannot be distinguished from the Yellowstone cutthroat trout, and before the construction of dams,  no physical barriers were between the ranges of the two subspecies in the Snake River drainage.

The subspecies was scientifically named in 1995 in a popular book by columnist M. R. Montgomery, to honor the fisheries research of Dr. Robert J. Behnke, who had presented its (unnamed) description in 1992.

Hybrids
While fine-spotted x rainbow trout crosses are observed in the South Fork of the Snake River in Idaho, they are infrequently encountered and appear to be hatchery hybrids. Conversely, Yellowstone x rainbow crosses are common; the "cutbows" of Yellowstone Park in the Lamar River drainage are natural hybrids.

Diet
In addition to their natural aversion to cross-breeding with other trout, fine-spotted cutthroats are unusual in their pursuit of a vertebrate diet, mainly other fish, but occasionally including small mammals. While the fine-spotted cutthroats can be very selective feeders during a major hatch of aquatic invertebrates, they are not as focused as rainbow or brown trout, and can be diverted with small terrestrial imitations. In addition, when no obvious hatch occurs, anglers can be very successful with large streamer flies that imitate small fish.

See also
Fishing in Wyoming

References

Further reading

External links
 Wyoming Fish & Game Commission 

Oncorhynchus
Cold water fish
Freshwater fish of the United States
Fish of the Western United States
Fauna of the Northwestern United States
Fauna of the Rocky Mountains
Fish described in 1995
Natural history of Montana
Natural history of Wyoming
Snake River